WJZQ (92.9 FM) is a 100,000-watt Cadillac, Michigan radio station broadcasting a hot adult contemporary format as Z93.  It is owned by Ross Biederman's Midwestern Broadcasting, who also owns WTCM-AM/FM and WCCW-AM/FM, all in Traverse City, MI.

History

WWTV-FM and WKJF-FM
WJZQ was originally WWTV-FM, co-owned with WWTV, then at channel 13. It was signed on in 1961 by John Fetzer, a well-known TV station owner in the midwest and a longtime owner of the Detroit Tigers baseball team.

The station's transmitter was on the fabled "Fetzer Mountain" in Osceola County, which was one of the highest points in Michigan. Many would claim that you could hear WKJF-FM on a good radio almost anywhere in Michigan. During some conditions, it can be heard as far south as Grand Rapids, Michigan.

The station aired beautiful music, but began simulcasting WWAM's "Top-40" format when that station signed on in 1968 . Later, it split from the simulcast and its call letters were changed to WKJF (Kalamazoo's John Fetzer).  In the 1980s, WKJF was airing adult contemporary music. In the early 1990s, the station was sold to Ross Biederman, who flipped the formats of both stations. WKJF-AM became a simulcast of news/talk WTCM-AM in Traverse City, and eventually standards, then sports WCCW (AM) also in Traverse City, and WKJF-FM became a WTCM-FM clone, marketing itself as WTCM though they only simulcasted part of the time, plus WKJF played more classic country than their Traverse City sister, and referred its own call letters only hourly with the FCC-mandated station identification.

Smooth Jazz 92.9 The Breeze
Plans were announced in the early 2000s (decade) to move WKJF-FM's tower to southern Kalkaska County. The move would allow 92.9 to have city-grade coverage in Traverse City, Michigan. People knew that a new radio station was in the works from the Biederman camp since WTCM-FM's transmitter's not too far from WKJF's. Shortly before the big move, on July 1, 2001, 92.9 The Breeze debuted. The station would start broadcasting from their Kalkaska County facilities in December that year.

This was not the first time northern Michigan had smooth jazz, as WJZJ 95.5/94.5 (along with WAVC 93.9 Mio) used the Jones feed in the 1990s as "Coast FM". The station flipped to alternative rock in 1998 as The Zone, citing new ownership and low ratings. (WAVC eventually dropped out of the "Zone" network to simulcast country sister station WMKC 102.9 St. Ignace as "Big Country.")

In 2004, it was announced that Ross Biederman was selling WKJF-AM to Good News Media, owners of WLJN-FM/AM Traverse City, for $80,001 - $1 for the station itself and $80,000 for the land. The station now rebroadcasts Christian talk WLJN-AM as WLJW. In 1982, Biederman donated the original WTCM-AM 1400 to Good News when he moved the station to 580 AM and boosted the station's power to 2,500 watts.

Format shift
When The Breeze started broadcasting from their new facilities, ratings for the station skyrocketed, though they have tapered off since then. In response, the station added local, yet voicetracked personalities, cut back on the Jones Smooth Jazz satellite programming to only nights and weekends, and evolved its playlist during local dayparts to Soft Adult Contemporary.  Before long, the Jones Smooth Jazz programming was completely gone from 92.9 and it was one-hundred-percent locally programmed, with the playlist including "middle of the road" artists such as Carpenters, Barbra Streisand, Barry Manilow and Olivia Newton-John mixed with AC currents, a handful of remnants from the jazz format such as Sade and Anita Baker, and even the occasional song by a local northern Michigan act.

In early November 2007, WJZQ began playing continuous Christmas music 24/7 - the first time this station had done so - to compete with WLXT 96.3 FM, which has traditionally been northern Michigan's first station to go all-Christmas for the holiday season.

In March 2008, The Breeze shifted its format again, to a Modern AC sound, playing currents and recurrents from 3 Doors Down, Ferras, Sara Bareilles, Amy Winehouse, Plain White Ts, O.A.R. and Coldplay. The station eliminated most of their softer titles from acts such as Kenny G, James Taylor, Carpenters and George Benson.

On September 28, 2009, the station shifted towards a Top 40 (CHR) format, renamed The New Z93 - Today's Best Hits, complete with new imaging and some jock changes. The station now incorporates more rhythmic and pop material, particularly during the evening hours, from artists such as Britney Spears, Lady Gaga, R. Kelly, The Black Eyed Peas and T.I. With the format shift, the station did not go all-Christmas for the 2009 holiday season, leaving WLXT as the sole all-Christmas station in the market (save for WLXT's Dial Global America's Best Music sister station WMBN).

The station broadcasts from Biederman's Radio Centre building in downtown Traverse City.

The WJZQ calls were formerly used by the station now known as WIIL in Kenosha, Wisconsin.

This is the second time Midwestern Broadcasting has owned a Top 40 station with the moniker "Z93".  WATZ-FM in Alpena (then at 93.5) was known as "Z93" during its short stint as a Top 40/CHR outlet during the early 1980s.

Z93: The 90s to Now
On January 25, 2023, WJZQ began teasing that "changes are coming", and playing "Today's Best Hits (For Now)" that will have its "world premiere" on February 1, at 9:29 A.M. At that time, WJZQ shifted to hot adult contemporary, keeping the "Z93" branding, while repositioning its playlist to "Hits From The 90s To Now". The first song after the relaunch was "Tearin' Up My Heart" by NSYNC.

Jingles
The station started using jingles in 2010 with Kiss Boston 2003 and Kiss Boston 2006 from Reelworld.

The station currently uses the Reelworld One CHR service. All sweepers and liners are voiced by Harry Legg.

Competition
The station previously competed with WKHQ, the market's only other Top 40/CHR station.

References

External links

Michiguide.com - WJZQ history

JZQ
Hot adult contemporary radio stations in the United States
Wexford County, Michigan
Radio stations established in 1961